Bacotoma poecilura is a moth in the subfamily Spilomelinae of the family Crambidae. It was described by Hering in 1903. It is found in Indonesia (Java) and on Borneo.

References

Spilomelinae
Moths described in 1903
Moths of Indonesia